Farkas utcai színház was a theatre in Kolozsvár in Hungary, founded in 1821 and closed in 1906. It is known as the first permanent theatre building in Hungary, and played a pioneering role in the development of the professional theatre in Hungary. It also played a pioneering role in Hungarian Opera, and was an opera house in 1887–1896. It was the first of three theatres built in Hungary before the National Theatre (Budapest) in 1837. While the first Hungarian language professional theatre had been founded in 1789, Hungarian theatre consisted of travelling theatre companies until the foundation of Farkas utcai színház in 1821.

References

 Káli Nagy Lázár: Visszaemlékezései: Az erdélyi magyar színészet hőskora (1792–1821). Bevezetéssel ellátta dr. Jancsó Elemér. Kolozsvár: Minerva. 1939. = Erdélyi Ritkaságok, 1.

1821 establishments in the Austrian Empire
19th-century establishments in Hungary
1906 disestablishments in Europe
1906 in Hungary
Theatres in Hungary
Opera houses in Hungary